Barreirinha is a municipality located in the Brazilian state of Amazonas. Its population was 32,483 (2020) and its area is 5,751 km².

Transport 
The locality is served by the Barreirinha Airport.

References

Municipalities in Amazonas (Brazilian state)